The Edong Yangtze River Bridge is a cable-stayed bridge across the Yangtze River in Hubei Province in eastern China. The bridge connects Huangshi and Xishui County and forms part of the G45 Daqing–Guangzhou Expressway and the G50 Shanghai–Chongqing Expressway. Construction of the bridge started in 2008 and it was completed in 2010.  With a main span of  it is  the fourth longest cable-stayed bridge in the world.

See also
Yangtze River bridges and tunnels
List of largest cable-stayed bridges
List of tallest bridges in the world

References 

Bridges over the Yangtze River
Cable-stayed bridges in China
Bridges completed in 2010
Huangshi
Bridges in Hubei